Symphony No. 103 in E major (H. 1/103) is the eleventh of the twelve London symphonies written by Joseph Haydn. This symphony is nicknamed The Drumroll after the long roll on the timpani with which it begins.  It is from 1795, and his second-to-last symphony.

Composition and premiere

The symphony was the eleventh of twelve that were composed for performance in England during Haydn's two journeys there (1791–1792, 1794–1795), arranged and organized by the great impresario, Johann Peter Salomon. Haydn's music was well known in England well before the composer traveled there, and members of the British musical public had long expressed the wish that Haydn would visit. The composer's reception in England was in fact very enthusiastic, and the English visits were one of the most fruitful and happy periods of the composer's life. Haydn composed the "Drumroll" Symphony while living in London during the winter of 1794–1795.

It was premiered on March 2, 1795 as part of a concert series called the "Opera Concerts" at the King's Theatre. The orchestra was unusually large for the time, consisting of about 60 players. The task of directing the work was divided between the concertmaster, the violinist Giovanni Battista Viotti, and Haydn, who sat at a fortepiano. The premiere was evidently a success, and The Morning Chronicle's reviewer wrote:

The Sun wrote:

Haydn later performed the work in Vienna, and for this purpose made a small cut in the final movement, which is usually respected by conductors today.

Since its premiere, the "Drumroll" Symphony has been a favorite among Haydn's symphonies, and it is frequently performed and recorded today. In 1831, Richard Wagner arranged it for piano.

The symphony takes about 30 minutes to perform.

Scoring

The work is scored for 2 flutes, 2 oboes, 2 clarinets, 2 bassoons, 2 horns, 2 trumpets, timpani, and strings.

Movements

The work is in standard four-movement form.

I. Adagio – Allegro con spirito

After the opening drum roll, the bass instruments play a somber opening theme:

As commentators have pointed out, the first four notes of which match the Dies Irae chant, part of the Latin mass for the dead:

H. C. Robbins Landon has remarked that at the start the theme is ambiguous between duple and triple time and between the keys of C minor and (what ultimately proves the case) E major.

The sprightly Allegro con spirito that follows this introduction is in sonata form and  time with an extended transition to the secondary theme. In a number of places, it restates the theme of the introduction in much faster tempo. Haydn restates part of the opening introduction in the coda, a formal procedure previously adopted by Mozart in his String Quintet K. 593 (1790). Beethoven was to do the same in his "Pathétique" piano sonata, published four years after the "Drumroll" Symphony in 1799.

II. Andante più tosto allegretto

In double variation form, with alternating themes in C minor and C major plus coda. The double variations had been a favorite musical form of the composer for about 20 years. Along with the Piano Trio H. XV:23 from the same year, this was the last set he wrote. The themes are said to have been developed by Haydn from Croatian folk songs he knew – for discussion, see Haydn and folk music. Some different features in this movement include a long violin solo, as well as the lack of clarinets.

III. Menuetto

The minuet is in the home key of E major. Charles Rosen, in The Classical Style, chose this minuet to illustrate the point that Classical-era minuets often have very strong first beats, in contrast to the more flowing rhythm of the Baroque minuet.

IV. Finale: Allegro con spirito

The finale is in fast tempo, has a monothematic exposition, and is in sonata rondo form. Like the first movement, it begins with a quasi-ritual gesture – in this case, a horn call:

The horn call is followed by a pause, then repeated as accompaniment to the main theme, and indeed echoed throughout the movement.

Like the themes of the second movement, the opening melody was claimed by Franjo Kuhač to be taken by Haydn from Croatian folk song, in this case a tune called "Divojčica potok gazi" ("A little girl treads on a brook").

Robbins Landon notes that this finale is one of the longest in the London Symphonies. He calls it "one of the great tours-de-force, formally speaking, of Haydn's career:  the creation of a long movement on a single theme in which our interest never flags; on the contrary, it is a Finale of unusual tension and strength."

Rather unusually for Haydn, he altered the fourth movement after it was completed, removing 13 bars fairly close to the end. Robbins Landon suggests that Haydn removed the passage because it "would hold up the course of the movement." The symphony is occasionally performed with the deleted passage included; e.g. in recorded versions by Antal Doráti and Frans Brüggen.

See also
List of symphonies by name

Notes

References
Robbins Landon, H. C. (1976) Haydn: Chronicle and Works, Indiana University Press, Bloomington.
Rosen, Charles (1971, 2nd ed. 1997) The Classical Style. New York: Norton.
Schroeder, David P. (1985) "Audience Reception and Haydn's London Symphonies," International Review of the Aesthetics and Sociology of Music, Vol. 16, No. 1, pp. 57–72.

External links
 
 Program notes written by James M. Keller for the San Francisco Symphony

Symphony 103
Compositions in E-flat major
1795 compositions